First Presbyterian Church of Abilene (Tietjens Center for the Performing Arts) was a historic church building at 300 N. Mulberry Street in Abilene, Kansas.

History
It was built in 1882 and added to the National Register of Historic Places in 2001.  The building was destroyed by a fire on July 23, 2014.

References

Presbyterian churches in Kansas
Churches on the National Register of Historic Places in Kansas
Romanesque Revival church buildings in Kansas
Gothic Revival church buildings in Kansas
Churches completed in 1882
Buildings and structures in Dickinson County, Kansas
National Register of Historic Places in Dickinson County, Kansas
Former National Register of Historic Places in Kansas